FC Vorskla-2 Poltava was a Ukrainian football team based in Poltava, Ukraine in 1997 through 2005.

The club has been featured regularly in the Ukrainian Second Division it served as a junior team for the FC Vorskla Poltava franchise. Like most tributary teams, the best players are sent up to the senior team, meanwhile developing other players for further call-ups.

Notable players
 Andriy Pyatov
 Petro Kondratyuk, all-time leading top scorer
 Oleksandr Bessarab, single season top scorer

Coaches
 1997–98 Serhiy Sobetskyi
 1998–01 Ivan Shariy
 2001–02 Semen Osynovskyi
 2002–03 Oleh Morhun
 2003–04 Viktor Nosov
 2004–05 Oleksandr Omelchuk

References

 
FC Vorskla Poltava
Vorskla Poltava-2
Vorskla-2 Poltava
Association football clubs established in 1997
Association football clubs disestablished in 2005
1997 establishments in Ukraine
2005 disestablishments in Ukraine